Never Breathe What You Can't See is a studio album by Jello Biafra and The Melvins, released in 2004 through Alternative Tentacles.

Songs recorded during the same sessions and remixes of four songs were used for the follow up album, Sieg Howdy!, released in 2005.

Track listing
All songs written by Buzz Osborne and lyrics by Jello Biafra, except where noted.
"Plethysmograph" (Music: Biafra) – 4:49
"McGruff the Crime Dog" – 4:18
"Yuppie Cadillac" (Music: Biafra) – 4:31
"Islamic Bomb" (Music: Biafra) – 6:19
"The Lighter Side of Global Terrorism" – 4:35
"Caped Crusader" (Music: Biafra, Osborne) – 6:08
"Enchanted Thoughtfist" – 4:18
"Dawn of the Locusts" – 5:12

Personnel
Osama McDonald – vocals
Jon Benet Milosevic – guitars, backing vocals
George W. McVeigh – bass, slide bass (8)
Saddam Disney – drums, percussion, lead guitar (3, 5)
with
Adam Jones – guitars (4, 6-8)

Additional personnel
Tom 5 – backing vocals
John The Baker – backing vocals
Adrienne Droogas – backing vocals
Wendy-O-Matik – backing vocals
Loto Ball – backing vocals
Johnny NoMoniker – backing vocals
Ali G. North – backing vocals, producer
Lady Monster – backing vocals
Jesse Luscious – backing vocals
Marshall Lawless – producer
Toshi Kasai – engineer, mixing
Matt Kelley – engineer
Drew Fischer – engineer
Javier E. Javier – asst. engineer
Mackie Osborne – art direction & design

References

2004 albums
Alternative Tentacles albums
Jello Biafra albums
Melvins albums
Collaborative albums